Khulna Polytechnic Institute (abbreviated as KPI) is a government-owned polytechnic located in Khulna, Bangladesh. It is one of the biggest and oldest polytechnics in the country.

History
Work began on a technical training center in Khulna during Pakistan's First Five-Year Plan (1955–60). By 1963, construction of institute buildings, workshops, student hostels, and staff housing was well underway.

Campus & Hostels
Since 2008, the hostel of Khulna Polytechnic Institute has been closed.

Academics
About 4000 students are pursuing diploma studies in engineering in this institution. At present, KPI has 9 teaching departments. Every year the intake of diploma students is around 800. A total of about one hundred teachers are teaching in these departments and institutes. Khulna Polytechnic Institute has the following departments:
 Civil engineering (100+100)
 Electrical engineering (100+100)
 Electronic engineering (50+50)
 Mechanical engineering (100+100)
 Power engineering (50+50)
 Biophysical environment (50+50)
 Computer engineering (50+50)
Instrumentation & Process Control Technology (I.P.C.T)(50+50) 
Instrumentation & Process Control Technology (50+50) 
 Refrigeration & Air-conditioning (50+50)
The Bangladesh Technical Education Board oversees the curriculum.

References

External links
 

Polytechnic institutes in Khulna Division
Educational institutions of Khulna District
Educational institutions established in 1963
1960s establishments in East Pakistan